Austerberry is a surname. Notable people with the surname include:

Horace Austerberry (1868–1946), British football manager 
Paul Denham Austerberry (born 1966), Canadian production designer
Sidney Austerberry (1908–1996), Anglican archdeacon